The county of Cheshire contains some Norman architecture. As Nikolaus Pevsner and Edward Hubbard state, this is not much in comparison with other counties.  What there is includes the following:

Structures

Furnishings

Other

References
Citations

Sources

Cheshire
 
Norman architecture
Lists of buildings and structures in Cheshire